Pasquale Fornara (29 March 1925 – 24 July 1990) was a professional Italian road bicycle racer who gained fame in the 1950s by winning the Tour de Suisse stage race four times, a record that still stands to this day.

In addition to his Tour de Suisse achievements, Fornara won the 1956 Tour de Romandie and finished on the podium in two Grand Tours: a third place behind the legendary Fausto Coppi at the 1953 Giro d'Italia and a second place at the 1958 Vuelta a España behind Frenchman Jean Stablinski.

Major achievements 

1952
 1st, Overall, Tour de Suisse (and 2 stage wins)
 1st, Stage, Giro d'Italia
1953
 3rd, Overall, Giro d’Italia (and 1 stage win)
 1st, King of the Mountains
1954
 1st, Overall, Tour de Suisse
1955
 4th, Overall, Tour de France
 1st, Stage, Giro d’Italia
1956
 1st, Overall, Tour de Romandie
 1st, Stage, Giro d'Italia
 24th, Overall, Tour de France
1957
 1st, Overall, Tour de Suisse (and 1 stage win)
 1st, King of the Mountains
1958
 1st, Overall, Tour de Suisse (and 2 stage wins)
 2nd, Overall, Vuelta a España

External links
 

1925 births
1990 deaths
Italian male cyclists
Sportspeople from the Province of Novara
Italian Giro d'Italia stage winners
Tour de Suisse stage winners
Cyclists from Piedmont
People from Borgomanero